Teufelsbach, also called Ostfeldgraben and Freisker Bach, is a river of North Rhine-Westphalia, Germany. It is a tributary of the Rhynerscher Bach. Its largest fraction is part of the city of Hamm.

See also
List of rivers of North Rhine-Westphalia

Rivers of North Rhine-Westphalia
Rivers of Germany